Vitulli is a surname. It is the surname of:
Christian Vitulli (born 1988), tennis player at the 2006 Wimbledon Championships – Boys' Singles
Marie A. Vitulli, American mathematician
Rocco Vitulli, one of the Lucchese crime family mobsters
Thea Vitulli (born 1900), Argentine opera soprano in Belfagor and La Boheme